Gymnoscelis esakii is a moth in the family Geometridae. It is found in Korea, Japan and Russia.

References

Moths described in 1955
esakii
Moths of Japan